Castilleja kaibabensis is a species of flowering plant in the family Orobanchaceae known by the common name Kaibab Plateau Indian paintbrush. It is endemic to the Kaibab Plateau of Coconino County, Arizona, in the United States.

Castilleja kaibabensis is a woody perennial herb with hairy stems and hairy, lance-shaped leaves. The inflorescence contains hairy bracts in shades of yellow and orange. The bract color is variable within and between populations. The bracts are divided into lobes, a characteristic that can help identify the plant. Blooming occurs in July.

Castilleja kaibabensis grows in meadows between stands of spruce, fir, and aspen. The soils, derived from Kaibab limestone, are silty, clayey, or rocky. The plant tends to grow in drier spots in the habitat. It easily colonizes disturbed spots, as well.

Castilleja kaibabensis is one of fourteen Castilleja that occur in the state of Arizona. While the population is apparently stable, the population counts are likely inaccurate because another, similar Castilleja species, Castilleja integra, grows in the same area.

References

External links
photo of herbarium specimen at Missouri Botanical Garden, collected in Arizona in 1970

kaibabensis
Flora of Arizona
Endemic flora of the United States
Natural history of the Grand Canyon
Flora of the Colorado Plateau and Canyonlands region
~
Natural history of Coconino County, Arizona
Endangered flora of the United States
Plants described in 1973